The 2024 Sukma Games, officially known as the 21st Sukma Games is a multi-sport event that will be held in Sarawak. Johor was supposed to host the 20th edition of the Games in July 2020, but were postponed due to the COVID-19 pandemic, with the 20th edition took over by the National Sports Council (NSC) in September 2022. This will be Sarawak's third time to host the Sukma Games since its first time in 1990, and second time in 2016.

Marketing

Logo

The official logo of the 2024 Sukma Games is jawi writing graphic of the word ‘Jim’ which representing the state of Johor that resembled a festival torch. It represents Jawi writing as the pride of the people of Johor who still upheld the jawi writing. Gambier and black pepper the natural treasures of the state were depicted in the logo.

Mascot
The official mascot of the 2024 Sukma Games is a Malayan tiger named Jimi. He represented bravery and fierceness and also highlighted the characteristics of the Johor Sultanate which was the identity of the state of Johor. He is described as cute and friendly but aggressive and fierce when playing sports.

References

Sport in Sarawak
Sukma Games